Ab Talak (also Romanized as Āb Talak) is a village in Milas Rural District, in the Central District of Lordegan County, Chaharmahal and Bakhtiari Province, Iran. At the 2006 census, its population was 30, in 7 families.

References 

Populated places in Lordegan County